Mariners Harbor is a neighborhood located in the northwestern part of New York City's borough of Staten Island. It is bordered by Lake Avenue to the east, Forest Avenue to the south, Richmond Terrace to the north, and Holland Avenue to the west. The northwestern section of Mariners Harbor is often known as Arlington.

History
The neighborhood is named for its 19th-century harvesting of oysters and other seafood products from the Kill Van Kull, which forms the neighborhood's northern border (Elm Park and Port Ivory lie to the east and west, respectively, while Graniteville is to the south). Later developments included shipbuilding, repair and marine salvage work. Fishing activity declined due to pollution during the 20th century. The Mariners Harbor Yacht Club remains as a reminder of the community's maritime past. Erastina was the first rail station built here in 1886 and named for Erastus Wiman, the promoter who helped the Baltimore & Ohio Railroad to enter New York via Staten Island. Vacant land nearby was used for staging Buffalo Bill’s “Wild West Show”, generating over 10,000 additional passengers from the St. George Ferry Terminal over the new rail line. Erastina became Mariners Harbor soon after Wiman fell from public favor due to scandal and bankruptcy. There are three other stations along the North Shore branch of the Staten Island Railway at Lake Avenue, Harbor Road, and Arlington. Passenger service on this line was discontinued on March 31, 1953. An important rail customer was Arthur Dreyer & Sons Lumber and Coal Co. near Union Avenue bridge. Remnants of the site are visible today by the coal silos. The western portion of this line was rebuilt, and is now used by freight trains traveling between New Jersey and the Howland Hook Marine Terminal in Port Ivory.

Mariners Harbor was home to large shipping and dry dock companies in the first half of the 20th century, including Bethlehem Steel, which owned a considerable portion of land in the area with headquarters along the waterfront on Richmond Terrace across from Mersereau Avenue and Brewers Dry Dock. Bethlehem Staten Island built United States Navy Destroyers during World War II. Currently, two tugboat companies—K-Sea and McAllister—operate in the area as do a number of smaller dry docks, Great Lakes Dredge and Dock, and Mariners Harbor Cargo Terminal. The John McAllister tug boat was listed on the National Register of Historic Places in 2001.

The West Shore Little League and Public School 44 also are part of the neighborhood. The former Cross Paper Plant sits on the edge of the area and now is used as rental space for other small business. In recent years a large amount of shopping has been built up in stretch of Forest Avenue from Lake Avenue to South Avenue, revitalizing the area and bringing new traffic concerns.

Mariners Harbor is home to the newest branch of the New York Public Library system. Located at 206 South Avenue, the library was opened on December 16, 2013 as the 13th branch in Staten Island, and the 88th system-wide. The building is shaped like an oyster to reflect the neighborhood's maritime history, and won the 2008 Award for Excellence in Design from New York City's Design Commission. A single-story branch library situated on a 16,000-square foot plot, it serves some 30,000 people.

The ZIP Code for Mariners Harbor is 10303.

Demographics

The area originally populated by the Dutch and French Huguenot settlers of 17th and 18th centuries bears the famous names of those families, which include: Van Name Avenue, Van Pelt Avenue, Brabrant Street, Lockman Avenue and Mersereau Avenue. The oldest church in the neighborhood is the Summerfield Methodist Church, founded in 1840. It still stands on Harbor Road and has an active multicultural congregation, reflecting the demographics of the neighborhood. On the corner of Richmond Terrace and Lockman Avenue is the Fellowship Baptist Church, which was founded by community leader Rev. Arthur D. Phillips. The church has a large black congregation and has gained considerable political influence, being visited by New York City mayors David Dinkins, Rudolph Giuliani, and Michael Bloomberg on multiple occasions during their terms of office.  Other churches in the area include the Seventh Day Adventist Church and St. Clement-St.Michael's Roman Catholic Church.

From the early 1900s to the 1930s, the area became home to many Italian-Americans, who still comprise a significant percentage of its population. The neighborhood was permanently transformed, however, in 1954, when the New York City Housing Authority opened the 605-unit Mariners Harbor Houses public housing project in the heart of the community,. The portion of the neighborhood west of Harbor Road (both north and south of the railroad tracks) eventually became predominantly Black. The area east of Harbor Road remained White longer, but has gradually become more Hispanic. All sections of the neighborhood have a substantial representation of Hispanics, Blacks, and Whites, with the southern portion of the neighborhood having a small Asian population. (Census Tract 231 has a 13% Asian population, a 442% increase from 2000, which was the fastest growth rate in the Asian population of any tract on Staten Island.)

The northwest portion of Staten Island (which includes Mariners Harbor) as well as the Far South Shore are the fastest growing areas of Staten Island.

The 10303 zip code, which includes Mariners Harbor, Elm Park, Arlington, and parts of Graniteville, has the highest percentage of Puerto Ricans out of any zip code on Staten Island, at 18.3%. It also has the second-highest total Hispanic percentage, at 37.1%, closely behind 10302, at 41.3%. It has the highest Black percentage of any zip code at 37.5% (33.6% Non-Hispanic Black), and the third-highest Asian percentage. It has the lowest percentage of Non-Hispanic Whites, at 19.0%.

As of the 2010 census, the demographics of Mariners Harbor were roughly 14.2% White, 36% Black, 39.4% Hispanic, 7.9% Asian, 2.5% Other. This is defining Mariners Harbor as everything within the boundaries of Census Tract 231, 319.01, as well as Block Group 1 of Tract 223.

Police and crime
Mariners Harbor is patrolled by the 121st Precinct of the NYPD, located at 970 Richmond Ave, Staten Island, NY 10314. The 121st Precinct ranked 10th with 3.6 crimes per 1000 residents, respectively.

The 121st precinct reported 1 murder, 34 rapes, 0 robberies, 5 felony assaults, 2 burglaries, 4 grand larcenies, and 2 grand larcenies auto in 2019.

Fire safety

Mariners Harbor is served by the New York City Fire Department (FDNY)'s Engine Co. 158, located at 65 Harbor Road.

Post office and ZIP Codes
Mariners Harbor is located within two ZIP Codes: 10303 north of Baron Hirsch Cemetery and 10314 south of the cemetery. The United States Postal Service operates the Mariners Harbor Finance Station at 2079 Forest Avenue.

Education

Schools
Most students in Mariners Harbor are zoned for Port Richmond High School, I.S.51, and P.S.22 and P.S.44, as well as a section that can generally be described as north of Continental Place and west of Van Pelt Avenue that is zoned for I.S 72 in Heartland Village  P.S. 44 is located on 80 Maple Parkway and its current principal is Joseph Miller.  P.S 44. has small class sizes, however the downside of P.S. 44 it is a somewhat worn building and furnishings.  It offers grades Pre-K to fifth grade, and as of 2006 it had 69 full-time teachers and 5 part-time teachers, and has a total of 860 students enrolled, which makes the teacher student ratio 1:13. As of 2011, there were 884 students, with a student:teacher ratio of 12.5:1

Library
The New York Public Library (NYPL)'s Mariners Harbor branch is located at 206 South Avenue. Mariners Harbor Library is located amidst the rich maritime heritage of Staten Island's Mariners Harbor neighborhood.  The one-story branch opened on December 16, 2013 and is located on a  land plot. Mariners Harbor is the thirteenth branch of The New York Public Library on Staten Island and serves roughly 30,000 people.

Transportation
Mariners Harbor is served by the  local bus routes (and their rush-hour-only limited-stop counterparts, which are  respectively).

References 

1790 establishments in New York (state)
 
Neighborhoods in Staten Island
Populated places established in 1790